The 2000 Ukrainian Amateur Cup  was the fifth annual season of Ukraine's football knockout competition for amateur football teams. The competition started on 2 July 2000 and concluded on 15 October 2000.

Teams

Notes:
 SC Perechyn previously played under the name of Lisnyk Perechyn

Five regions that were represented last season, chose not to participate in the competition among which are such oblasts Ivano-Frankivsk, Odesa, Poltava, Sumy, and Ternopil.

Competition schedule

First qualification round

Second qualification round

Quarterfinals (1/4)

Semifinals (1/2)

Final

See also
 2000 Ukrainian Football Amateur League
 2000–01 Ukrainian Cup

External links
 2000 Ukrainian Amateur Cup  at the Footpass (Football Federation of Ukraine)

Ukrainian Amateur Cup
Ukrainian Amateur Cup
Amateur Cup